Sydney George Holland, 2nd Viscount Knutsford (19 March 185527 July 1931) was a British barrister and peer.

Background and education
Knutsford was the eldest twin son of the Conservative politician Henry Holland, 1st Viscount Knutsford, and his wife Elizabeth Margaret Hibbert. His grandfather was the physician and travel writer Sir Henry Holland, 1st Baronet. His mother died when he was three years old. He was educated at Wellington College and Trinity Hall, Cambridge, and was called to the Bar in 1879.

Career
In 1898 Knutsford was elected as Chairman of the East and West India Dock Company. He was a Director of many companies including an English, Scottish and Australian Bank, and the Underground Electric Railways Company. He was also a Director of City and South London Railway, London and Scottish Life Assurance Company and was an Honorary Fellow of Trinity Hall, Cambridge. He was made a Chairman of Poplar Hospital in 1891 before becoming president in 1920 and he was Chairman of the London Hospital House Committee from 1896 to 1931. He succeeded his father as Viscount Knutsford in 1914.

Holland acted as justice of the peace for London and Middlesex, and awarded the Order of Saint John (chartered 1888).

Family
Lord Knutsford married Lady Mary Ashburnham, daughter of Bertram Ashburnham, 4th Earl of Ashburnham, in 1883. They had two daughters. He died in July 1931, aged 76. As he had no sons he was succeeded in his titles by his younger twin brother, Arthur.

His daughters were:

Hon. Lucy Katherine (15 Sept. 1886)
Hon. Rachael Mary (6 June 1977), who married Brigadier Lord Douglas Malise Graham son of Douglas Graham, 5th Duke of Montrose and had issue.

Arms

References

Book cited

1855 births
1931 deaths
English barristers
People educated at Wellington College, Berkshire
Alumni of Trinity Hall, Cambridge
Viscounts in the Peerage of the United Kingdom
English twins